Deus Ex is a cyberpunk franchise created by Ion Storm and owned and published by Eidos Interactive and later Square Enix.

Video games

Main series

Spin-off games

Print media

Novels

Comic books

Art books

Soundtracks

References 

Media
Deus Ex
Deus Ex